The French-speaking electoral college is one of three constituencies of the European Parliament in Belgium. It currently elects 8 MEPs using the D'Hondt method of party-list proportional representation. It elected 9 MEPs until the 2007 accession of Bulgaria and Romania.

Prior to the 1999 elections, electors in the German-speaking community were voting in the French-speaking electoral college, along with the rest of the Walloon region where they are located; they vote now in their own German-speaking electoral college.

Boundaries 
The constituency corresponds to the French Community of Belgium. In officially bilingual Brussels, electors can choose between lists of this electoral college or those of the Dutch-speaking electoral college.

Prior to the 2011–2012 state reform, electors could choose between both lists not only in Brussels, but in an area encompassing unilingually Dutch territory, Brussels-Halle-Vilvoorde. Some towns in the officially Dutch-speaking Brussels Periphery still have this option however.

Members of the European Parliament

2009–2014 
 Frédéric Daerden, PS
 Véronique de Keyser, PS
 Anne Delvaux, CDH
 Isabelle Durant, Ecolo
 Philippe Lamberts, Ecolo
 Louis Michel, MR
 Frédérique Ries, MR
 Marc Tarabella, PS

2004–2009 
 Philippe Busquin, Socialist Party
 Gerard Deprez, Reformist Movement
 Antoine Duquesne, Reformist Movement
 Alain Hutchinson, Socialist Party
 Pierre Jonckheer, Ecolo
 Véronique de Keyser, Socialist Party
 Joëlle Milquet, Democratic Humanist Centre
 Frédérique Ries, Reformist Movement
 Marc Tarabella, Socialist Party

Election results

2009

2004

References 

European Parliament constituencies in Belgium
Electoral colleges
1979 establishments in Belgium
Constituencies established in 1979